Loud Harp is an American Christian music worship duo from the cities of Lafayette, Colorado and Provo, Utah. Their group formed in May 2011, with Asher Seevinck and Dave Wilton. They have released two studio albums, Loud Harp in 2012, and Asaph in 2014. The second album was their breakthrough released upon the Billboard magazine charts.

Background
Loud Harp was a uniting between two musicians, A Boy and His Kite's Dave Wilton from Lafayette, Colorado, and, Seafinch's Asher Seevinck from Provo, Utah. They came together in May 2011.

Music history
The duo commenced as a musical entity in 2011, with their first release, Loud Harp, coming out on June 26, 2012, with Come&Live! Records. Their subsequent album, Asaph, releasing on April 8, 2014, from themselves independently. This album was their breakthrough release, upon the Billboard magazine charts, where it peaked at No. 44 on the Heatseekers Albums chart, a breaking-and-entry chart of new artists' music.

Members
Current members
 Asher Seevinck
 Dave Wilton

Discography
Studio albums

References

External links
Official website

Musical groups from Colorado
Musical groups from Utah
2011 establishments in Colorado
2011 establishments in Utah
Musical groups established in 2011
People from Lafayette, Colorado
American Christian musical groups
American musical duos